The ranks and insignia of the Ordnungspolizei were developed in 1936 after the nationalization of Germany's regular police forces.

Ordnungspolizei 

Ordnungspolizei (Orpo) ranks were based on local police titles and were considered a separate system from the ranks of the SS. It was also possible for Orpo members to hold dual status in both the Orpo and the SS, meaning that two ranks could be held simultaneously. In the case of Orpo generals, equivalent SS rank was always held in which case the Orpo general would be addressed by their SS rank first, followed by their police titles (for example: SS-Obergruppenführer und General der Polizei). In 1944, all Orpo generals also gained equivalent Waffen-SS rank so that, in the event of capture by the Allies, the Orpo general would hold status as a military officer instead of a police official.

Orpo personnel who were also members of the Allgemeine-SS were authorized to wear an embroidered SS Sigrunen patch on the breast pocket.

Ordnungspolizei rank insignia 

In addition to collar and shoulder insignia, Ordnungspolizei also wore the wreathed police eagle on the upper left sleeve. The collar patch and shoulderboards were backed, and the sleeve eagle (below the rank of Leutnant) embroidered, in truppenfarbe, a color-code which indicated the branch of police: green for Schutzpolizei (protection police) and police general officers, wine-red for Gemeindepolizei (municipal protection police), orange for rural Gendarmerie, carmine-red for fire brigades, gold for maritime police, light grey for administrative police.

General officers

''Note: Since most police generals, increasingly as time went on, were also SS generals, they typically wore an SS uniform except at police-specific functions.

Field and junior officers

Enlisted, NCOs and Senior NCO

 Source:

Rank and Pay

Mean annual pay for an industrial worker was 1,459 Reichsmark 1939, and for a privately employed  white-collar worker 2,772 Reichsmark.

References

 
Police of Nazi Germany

pl:Ordnungspolizei#Stopnie